The Bouès is a right tributary of the Arros, at the eastern end of the basin of the Adour, in the Southwest of France.

Geography 
The Bouès rises near Capvern, west of Lannemezan where it is fed by the Neste Canal. It flows north through a narrow valley and joins the Arros, downstream from Marciac, in a historical region known as Rivière-Basse.

Départements and towns 
 Hautes-Pyrénées : Capvern, Lutilhous, Bernadets-Dessus, Sère-Rustaing, Vidou.
 Gers : Miélan, Tillac (Gers), Marciac.

Main tributaries 
(R) Cabournieu, from Monpardiac
(L) Laüs or Lahus, from Laguian-Mazous
(R) Lis or Lys

References

Rivers of France
Rivers of Hautes-Pyrénées
Rivers of Gers
Rivers of Occitania (administrative region)